Akainothrips is a genus of thrips in the family Phlaeothripidae, first described by Laurence Mound in 1971. The type species is Akainothrips citritarsus (Girault, 1828).

The 34 species of this genus are  found only in Australia, in all mainland states and territories.

They live and breed in the galls created by other Phlaeothripinae species  on the phyllodes of Acacia species.

Species
 Akainothrips asketus
 Akainothrips bipictus
 Akainothrips calcica
 Akainothrips carnei
 Akainothrips ciliatus
 Akainothrips citritarsus
 Akainothrips crambus
 Akainothrips dalbyensis
 Akainothrips dubitalis
 Akainothrips exourus
 Akainothrips festus
 Akainothrips francisi
 Akainothrips galeus
 Akainothrips gremius
 Akainothrips herbae
 Akainothrips inionis
 Akainothrips ireneae
 Akainothrips iskae
 Akainothrips juliae
 Akainothrips magnetis
 Akainothrips monaro
 Akainothrips notius
 Akainothrips nyngani
 Akainothrips ochromelus
 Akainothrips papyris
 Akainothrips peronatus
 Akainothrips polysetulus
 Akainothrips quintarius
 Akainothrips roxbyi
 Akainothrips shirleyi
 Akainothrips tathrae
 Akainothrips tessarus
 Akainothrips tosofagi
 Akainothrips uncus

References

Phlaeothripidae
Thrips genera
Taxa named by Laurence Alfred Mound